State Route 255 (SR 255) is a south–north road in Davidson County, Tennessee that connects U.S. Route 31 (US 31) with US 70.

Route description 
SR 255 begins by heading east from Franklin Pike as Harding Place to cross I-65, US 31A/US 41A (Nolensville Pike/SR 11), and I-24.  After I-24, the route curves north as Donelson Pike to reach US 41/US 70S (Murfreesboro Pike/SR 1). SR 255 provides access to Nashville International Airport. It crosses I-40 and ends in Donelson at US 70 (Lebanon Pike/SR 24) in a commercial area.

Major intersections

See also 
List of state routes in Tennessee

References 

255